Kaski may refer to:

Places
Kaski District, a part of Province No. 4 in Nepal
Dąbrowa-Kaski, a village in Gmina Szepietowo, Wysokie Mazowieckie County, Podlaskie Voivodeship, Poland
Kaski, Łódź Voivodeship, a village in Gmina Galewice, Wieruszów County, Poland
Kaski, Masovian Voivodeship, a village in Gmina Baranów, Grodzisk Mazowiecki County, Poland

Other uses
Kaski (surname)
Kayseri Kaski S.K., a women's basketball club in Turkey

See also
Kasky